The Wannon Falls are a punchbowl waterfall located in the Southern Grampians Shire, approximately  west of Hamilton, in western Victoria, Australia. The falls are fed by the Wannon River that has its head waters in the Grampians mountains.

Location and features
The falls are unexpected after driving west across gently undulating lava plains. In the winter wet season they can be spectacular, and at the end of the summer dry season they may shrink to a mere trickle. Downstream of the falls there is a narrow steep-walled valley, with cascades around large blocks that have fallen in from the sides. The narrow valley was eroded as the falls retreated upstream as a result of undermining of a soft bed of sediments that underlies the hard basalt.

Adjacent to the falls there is a recreational reserve with picnic areas and some interpretation signs, and a larger scenic reserve that has natural native vegetation and some disturbed areas that have been replanted with natives.

See also

 List of waterfalls of Victoria
 Nigretta Falls

References

External links 
 Shire of Southern Grampians
 

Waterfalls of Victoria (Australia)
Tourist attractions in Victoria (Australia)
Punch bowl waterfalls
Grampians (national park)